Nevele is a village and former municipality located in the Belgian province of East Flanders. The municipality comprises the towns of Hansbeke, Landegem, Merendree, Nevele proper, Poesele and Vosselare. In 2018, the municipality of Nevele had a total population of 12,179. The total area is 51.89 km².

Effective 1 January 2019, the municipality was merged into Deinze.

Subdivisions
Nevele consisted of six deelgemeenten (sub-municipalities).

Nevele has borders with:
a. Lovendegem
b. Drongen (Ghent)
c. Sint-Martens-Leerne (Deinze)
d. Bachte-Maria-Leerne (Deinze)
e. Meigem (Deinze)
f. Lotenhulle (Aalter)
g. Bellem (Aalter)
h. Zomergem

Famous inhabitants
Cyriel Buysse, novelist
Renaat de Rudder: born in Oostakker in 1897, he moved with his parents to Landegem in 1909. In 1914 he volunteered for the Belgian army to fight in the first World War, where he wrote on the physical and moral pain he was suffering, until he died on 12 December 1917.
Rosalie Loveling and Virginie Loveling, writers, aunts of Cyriel Buysse
Leo Lovaert 
Monika van Paemel

Gallery

References

External links

Official website  - Only available in Dutch

 
Deinze
Populated places in East Flanders